This is the discography of British singer and actor Murray Head.

Albums

Studio albums

Live albums

Soundtrack albums

Cast recording albums

Compilation albums

EPs

Singles

Notes

References

External links

Discographies of British artists
Pop music discographies
Rock music discographies
New wave discographies